John E. Gottschalk (born 1943) is the retired chief executive officer and publisher of the Omaha World-Herald and was the national president of the Boy Scouts of America from 2008 to 2010.

Early life
Gottschalk grew up in Rushville, Nebraska.  He was a Boy Scout from 1951 until 1958, earning the rank of Life Scout.  His grandfather, Bill Barnes, founded the weekly newspaper Sheridan County Star.  Gottschalk's father became owner and publisher of the Star, where John Gottschalk also worked. He attended the University of Nebraska and majored in political science and journalism.

Gottschalk then purchased the Sidney Telegraph.  He was the mayor of Sidney, Nebraska from 1972 to 1975.

World-Herald
Gottschalk sold the Telegraph in 1974 and began working for the World-Herald in 1975 as an assistant to the president. He became a vice president and board member in 1980, president in 1985 and CEO and publisher in 1989.

During Gottschalk's tenure, the World-Herald Corporation expanded to include four daily newspapers, 21 weekly community newspapers, direct marketing and product fulfillment companies and minority ownership in the largest election-services company. The newspaper's Freedom Center production facility was named in his honor upon its opening in August 2001.

Gottschalk retired as CEO and publisher of the World-Herald on January 1, 2008 but remained the corporate chairman.

Scouting
Gottschalk has been active in the Boy Scouts of America, and received the Silver Beaver Award, Silver Antelope Award and the James E. West Award.  He is also a member of the 1910 Society and the Founders Circle.  He received the national Silver Buffalo Award in 2002.  He served as the chairman for the Mid-America Council from 1994 to 1995, the president of the Central Region, the national chairman for the 2001 National Scout Jamboree and the national executive vice president of the BSA from 2006 to 2008. Gottschalk was selected as the national president of the BSA on May 23, 2008.  He is a member of the National Executive Board of the Boy Scouts of America, the organization's governing body.

Personal life
Gottschalk's wife is named Carmen. The couple received the Woodrow Wilson Foundation National Distinguished Public Service Award in 2007.

References

1943 births
Living people
American publishing chief executives
People from Sheridan County, Nebraska
American philanthropists
National Executive Board of the Boy Scouts of America members
Mayors of places in Nebraska
People from Sidney, Nebraska
Presidents of the Boy Scouts of America